The F.J. Raible House is a historic building located in the West End of Davenport, Iowa, United States. F.J. Raible, who worked for a cigar manufacturer, began living in this house in 1884. While this house follows the Greek Revival style, which was very popular in Davenport, the main entrance and the windows are set within a slightly recessed plane. The window hoods are the only other decorative element on the house. This residence has been listed on the National Register of Historic Places since 1983.

References

Greek Revival houses in Iowa
Houses in Davenport, Iowa
Houses on the National Register of Historic Places in Iowa
National Register of Historic Places in Davenport, Iowa